Christopher John Suenson-Taylor, 3rd Baron Grantchester (known as John Grantchester; born 8 April 1951), is a British peer and Labour politician.

Early life
He is the son of the 2nd Baron Grantchester and Lady Grantchester (née Betty Moores) and was educated at Winchester College, where he was in the school football team, and at the London School of Economics, where he graduated Bachelor of Science in economics.

Business and charitable interests

Littlewoods
Lord Grantchester is the grandson of John Moores, and his mother was nominal head of the Moores family until her death in 2019, founders of the Liverpool-based Littlewoods football pools and retailing businesses. Lord Grantchester is a former director of Littlewoods. He is ranked 149th in the Sunday Times 2022 rich list with a net worth of £1.2bn.

Football
He was a director of his favoured football team, Everton. He has frequently been listed in the FourFourTwo rich list as a result of his shareholding. , he owned 8.5% of the club. He left the Everton board in December 2000.  He is a Trustee of The Foundation for Sport and the Arts. He is also a trustee of the David France Collection, the world's largest club specific football memorabilia collection.

Dairy farming
Lord Grantchester runs a dairy farm near Crewe, Cheshire. He is chairman of the South West Cheshire Dairy Association, and a Council Member of both the Cheshire Agricultural Society and  the Royal Agricultural Society.

Lord Grantchester was the chairman of one of the UK's largest milk and cheese businesses, Dairy Farmers of Britain, accounting for 10% of the UK milk market, when it entered receivership in June 2009.

House of Lords
In 1995, he succeeded to his father's title. He replaced the deceased Lord Milner of Leeds as one of the 92 hereditary peers remaining in the House of Lords under the House of Lords Act 1999 after defeating Viscount Hanworth by two votes to one in a by-election for the Labour seat in October 2003. He is a member of Labour Friends of Israel.

Under the leadership of Ed Miliband, he was an Opposition Whip from 8 October 2010 to 18 September 2015. He is currently a Shadow Minister for Environment, Food and Rural Affairs, a position he has held since 1 July 2014.

See also
List of hereditary peers elected under the House of Lords Act 1999

References

1951 births
Living people
People educated at Winchester College
Alumni of the London School of Economics
Barons in the Peerage of the United Kingdom
Labour Party (UK) hereditary peers
Labour Friends of Israel
British chairpersons of corporations
English football chairmen and investors
21st-century British farmers
Grantchester
Grantchester